The Petit Muveran is a mountain in the Bernese Alps, overlooking Ovronnaz in Valais. The summit is located on the border between Vaud and Valais. As its name suggests, it is situated near the higher Grand Muveran.

References

External links

Petit Muveran on Hikr.org

Mountains of the Alps
Mountains of Switzerland
Mountains of the canton of Vaud
Mountains of Valais
Valais–Vaud border
Two-thousanders of Switzerland